Aanandham Aarambham (ஆனந்தம் ஆரம்பம்) is a 2022 Indian-Tamil-language Romance streaming Micro-series, produced as an Original for Disney+ Hotstar, directed by Jagan. The principal characters of the series include Abhirami Venkatachalam and Santhosh Prathap. The series comprised eight episodes and was released on Disney+ Hotstar on January 13, 2022.

Synopsis
The story about a relationship of two coffee lovers, Ranjani (Abhirami Venkatachalam) and Ramcharan (Santhosh Prathap), starting from their proposal to their first wedding anniversary.

Cast
 Abhirami Venkatachalam as Ranjani
 Santhosh Prathap as Ramcharan

Development

Casting
The mini-series featuring Tamil actor Santhosh Prathap was cast as Ramcharan, who has delivered hit films like Oh My Kadavule (2020) and Sarpatta Parambarai (2021), and Bigg Boss Tamil Season 3 contestant Abhirami Venkatachalam was cast as Ranjani.

References

External links 
 Aanandham Aarambham at Disney+ Hotstar

Tamil-language web series
2022 Tamil-language television series debuts
Tamil-language Disney+ Hotstar original programming
Tamil-language romance television series